Heavenly King or Tian Wang is a Chinese title for various religious deities and divine leaders throughout history, as well as an alternate form of the term Son of Heaven, referring to the emperor. The Chinese term for Heavenly King consists of two Chinese characters meaning "heaven/sky" and "king". The term was most notably used in its most recent sense as the title of the kings of the Taiping Heavenly Kingdom, but is also used in religious (particularly Buddhist) contexts as well.

Historical uses

Spring and Autumn period 
In the Spring and Autumn period, the term Heavenly King was used to at least some extent to refer to the kings of the various Chinese states of the time. On the second page of the first text of the Spring and Autumn Annals, the term Heavenly King is used in the description of how the King of Zhou helped pay for the funeral expenses of a duke's son who had died:

The use of Heavenly King in this text is analogous to the term Son of Heaven.

Sixteen Kingdoms period 
During the period of the Sixteen Kingdoms, the term Heavenly King was especially common to refer to the leaders of Chinese states. Some notable examples states whose kings used this term include:

 Former Zhao: Liu Yuan, a member of Xiongnu nobility, claimed himself to be a Heavenly King after he became emperor in 304. A week after his death however, his son was overthrown and Liu Cong became emperor, who did not use the title.
 Later Zhao: Shi Le proclaimed himself Heavenly King in 330, while his son Shi Hu proclaimed himself Regent Heavenly King in 334.
 Ran Wei: Ran Min proclaimed himself Emperor of Ran Wei, a state which he created in 350. However, he was posthumously honored as Heavenly King by the Former Yan.
 Former Qin: Fu Jian, the third emperor of the Former Qin, proclaimed himself as Heavenly Emperor during his reign, as well as his wife becoming "Heavenly Mistress".
 Zhai Wei: Zhai Liao, the founder of Zhai Wei, used the title Heavenly King. Zhai's son, Zhai Zhao used the title as well before the collapse of his state.
 Later Liang: Lü Guang proclaimed himself Heavenly King upon the creation of the Later Liang state in 396. His son Lü Shao used the term during his brief rule in 400, as well as Lü Zuan, Lü Guang's eldest son and pretender to the throne, who seized power as the state's last leader until 401.
 Later Qin: In 416, Yao Xing proclaimed himself as a Heavenly King when he assumed power. His father, Yao Chang, did not use the term however.
 Later Yan: Murong Sheng proclaimed himself as Heavenly King, the fourth king of Later Yan.
 Northern Yan: Gao Yun, Feng Ba, and Feng Hong all proclaimed themselves as Heavenly Kings during their rule as king of Northern Yan.

Southern Song Dynasty 
During the Southern Song Dynasty, the title of Heavenly King was claimed by Yang Yao, a rebel leader in fighting against the Song government in Hunan. Yang's career as an anti-government leader began during Zhong Xiang's Revolt in 1130, where he served as a peasant soldier under the leadership of Zhong Xiang. Yang helped occupy the Dongting Lake area in the modern-day Hunan Province with some 80,000 other soldiers before Song forces arrived. After four successive attacks by the Song against opposition forces in 1132, Yao was appointed as chief leader of the opposition while the former leader Zhong Xiang retained power in a lesser role. As leader of opposition forces, Yang proclaimed himself the "Great Sage Heavenly King". Yang's tenure as the Great Sage Heavenly King was short lived however, lasting only three years. Following the seventh Song offensive in 1135, rebel defenses around Dongting Lake were broken, leading to the destruction of Yang Yao's "kingdom" and his own death.

Taiping Heavenly Kingdom 
The most recent historical, as well as most well known use of the title Heavenly King is from the rule of Hong Xiuquan during the Taiping Heavenly Kingdom. Unlike previous leaders such as those during the Sixteen Kingdoms period, the rationale behind proclaiming himself a "heavenly" king is quite different. The Taiping Heavenly Kingdom's origins were deeply rooted in quasi-nationalism and religious zeal, with Hong having stated that he had received direct orders from God to become king. This reasoning behind becoming king led to Hong believing that he had been appointed to become a heavenly king, that is, a king appointed directly by heaven inside a directly appointed heavenly kingdom.

Though the title of Heavenly King in the scope of the Taiping Heavenly Kingdom would be passed down to Hong Xiuquan's son, Hong Tianguifu upon his death; Hong Tianguifu was executed shortly after becoming king as a teenager, spelling an end to the use of the title in the scope of the Taiping Heavenly Kingdom.

Religious uses 
The term Heavenly King is used even today in a limited scope within Chinese Buddhism, with a much more religious meaning than most of its uses as a title. An example of its use is within the Four Heavenly Kings. The Four Heavenly Kings are four Buddhist gods, each of whom represents one cardinal direction. They are Vaiśravaṇa, Virūḍhaka, Dhṛtarāṣṭra, and Virūpākṣa.

Uses in other countries 
Outside China, the term Heavenly King has been sometimes used as a title to refer to a ruling king or divine entity. Two countries which have done this include Korea and Vietnam, both of which are in the Chinese cultural sphere of influence, especially historically. In Korea the term is used as a title for Hwanung, the legendary founder of Gojoseon, while in Vietnam it is used to refer to the mythical folk hero Thánh Gióng.

See also
 Chinese sovereign
 Chinese nobility
 Emperor of China
 Puxian Wannu
 Hong Xiuquan

References 

Sixteen Kingdoms
Chinese royal titles